W.A.K.O. European Championships 1988 were the ninth European kickboxing championships hosted by the W.A.K.O. organization arranged by W.A.K.O. president Ennio Falsoni.  The event was open to amateur men and women based in Europe only, with two categories on offer; Semi-Contact (both sexes) and Light-Contact (men only), with Light-Contact being introduced for the first time ever at a W.A.K.O. event.  As decided by WAKO's world congress in Munich 1987, international championship are to be split up into two events and locations to accommodate fighters for newly added Light-Contact and later Low-Kick.  Therefore, European championships for Full-Contact kickboxing and Forms took place at a separate event in Trogir, Yugoslavia.  Each country was allowed one competitor per weight class per category.  By the end of the event, hosts Italy were the top nation across all categories, with Great Britain second and regular European leaders West Germany in the third.  It was held at the Palasport Taliercio in Mestre, Italy in 1988.

Semi-Contact

Both men and women took part in Semi-Contact competitions in Mestre.  Semi-Contact differed from Full-Contact in that fights were won by points given due to technique, skill and speed, with physical force limited - more information on Semi-Contact can be found on the W.A.K.O. website, although the rules will have changed since 1988.  At Mestre the men had seven weight classes, starting at 57 kg/125.4 lbs and ending at over 84 kg/+184.8 lbs, while the women's competition had four weight classes beginning at 50 kg/110 lbs and ending at over 60 kg/132 lbs.  By the end of the championships, host nation Italy were the top country in Semi-Contact with six golds, one silver and one bronze medal.

Men's Semi-Contact Kickboxing Medals Table

Women's Semi-Contact Kickboxing Medals Table

Light-Contact

Light-Contact made its W.A.K.O. championships debut in Mestre.  It involved more physicality than Semi-Contact but less so than Full-Contact, with emphasis put on speed, skill and technique over power.  It was also seen as a stepping stone for fighters who were looking to make the transaction from Semi to Full-Contact.   More information on Light-Contact rules can be found of the W.A.K.O. website, although be aware that the rules may have changed since 1988.  At Mestre only men would take part in Light-Contact, with six weight classes, starting at 57 kg/125.4 lbs and ending at over 84 kg//+184.8 lbs.  West Germany were the strongest nation in Light-Contact, winning three golds, two silvers and one bronze.

Men's Light-Contact Kickboxing Medals Table

Overall Medals Standing (Top 5)

See also
List of WAKO Amateur European Championships
List of WAKO Amateur World Championships

References

External links
 WAKO World Association of Kickboxing Organizations Official Site

WAKO Amateur European Championships events
Kickboxing in Italy
1988 in kickboxing
Sport in Venice